The following lists events that happened in 1954 in Libya.

Incumbents
Monarch: Idris 
Prime Minister: 
 until February 16: Mahmud al-Muntasir 
 February 16-April 12: Muhammad Sakizli
 starting April 12: Mustafa Ben Halim

Births
 Ashour Suleiman Shuwail
 Mansour Bushnaf
 Suleiman Fortia

 
Years of the 20th century in Libya
Libya
Libya
1950s in Libya